Robert Greener (17 July 1899 – February 1970) was an English professional footballer who played as a half-back or an inside forward in the Football League for Crystal Palace and York City and in non-League football for Birtley Colliery. After retiring, he worked at Crystal Palace as assistant trainer and later trainer.

References

1899 births
People from Birtley, Tyne and Wear
Footballers from Tyne and Wear
1970 deaths
English footballers
Association football midfielders
Association football forwards
Crystal Palace F.C. players
York City F.C. players
English Football League players
Crystal Palace F.C. non-playing staff